Sabetha is a city in Brown and Nemaha counties in the U.S. state of Kansas.  As of the 2020 census, the population of the city was 2,545.

History 

The town's settlement began circa 1854, with a name reportedly derived from the word "Sabbath", the day the first settler arrived. Sabetha was incorporated as a city in 1874.

On the evening of June 13, 1998, an F2 tornado damaged much of the downtown, but no casualties were reported.  The downtown area received little warning as the tornado struck less than 1 minute after the tornado siren began to sound.  The tornado, which touched down half a mile west of the Sabetha City Hall, caused serious damage to two blocks of the town, with 18 buildings in the downtown area being damaged, five (including the city hall building) to near "the point of loss". The tornado lifted about half a mile east of City Hall. Damage to the city hall building amounted to $2 million, and additional damage to homes and vehicles away from downtown occurred due to tornado-toppled trees and branches away from the tornado's center along with strong straight-line winds.

Geography 
Sabetha is located at  (39.903109, −95.799408).

Demographics

2010 census
As of the census of 2010, there were 2,571 people, 1,090 households, and 645 families living in the city. The racial makeup of the city was 96.6% White, 0.9% African American, 0.5% Native American, 0.1% Asian, 0.1% Pacific Islander, 0.5% from other races, and 1.3% from two or more races. Hispanic or Latino of any race were 1.0% of the population.

There were 1,090 households, of which 27.4% had children under the age of 18 living with them, 49.4% were married couples living together, 6.6% had a female householder with no husband present, 3.1% had a male householder with no wife present, and 40.8% were non-families. Of all households, 37.2% were made up of individuals, and 20.5% had someone living alone who was 65 years of age or older. The average household size was 2.24 and the average family size was 2.97.

The median age in the city was 42.8 years. 25% of residents were under the age of 18; 5.4% were between the ages of 18 and 24; 22.3% were from 25 to 44; 23.1% were from 45 to 64; and 24.2% were 65 years of age or older. The gender makeup of the city was 47.5% male and 52.5% female.

2000 census
As of the census of 2000, there were 2,589 people, 958 households, and 611 families living in the city. The racial makeup of the city was 97.76% White, 0.93% African American, 0.15% Native American, 0.19% Asian, 0.04% Pacific Islander, 0.19% from other races, and 0.73% from two or more races. Hispanic or Latino of any race were 0.31% of the population.

There were 958 households, out of which 30.1% had children under the age of 18 living with them, 55.7% were married couples living together, 5.7% had a female householder with no husband present, and 36.2% were non-families. Of all households, 34.0% were made up of individuals, and 19.1% had someone living alone who was 65 years of age or older. The average household size was 2.33 and the average family size was 3.01.

In the city, the population was spread out, with 23.4% under the age of 18, 6.4% from 18 to 24, 22.8% from 25 to 44, 17.3% from 45 to 64, and 30.2% who were 65 years of age or older. The median age was 43 years. For every 100 females, there were 85.3 males. For every 100 females age 18 and over, there were 82.4 males.

The median income for a household in the city was $36,450, and the median income for a family was $45,000. Males had a median income of $31,958 versus $21,458 for females. The per capita income for the city was $22,126. About 3.7% of families and 7.0% of the population were below the poverty line, including 8.8% of those under age 18 and 7.3% of those age 65 or over.

Economy 
Sabetha has more jobs than residents, due in part to the large Wenger Manufacturing plant that produces extruders and related equipment. Schenck Process (formerly MAC Equipment) is also a large employer in the area, manufacturing bulk material handling and air filtration equipment. KSi Conveyors and USC are other notable employers in the area. The city managers estimate that the city has a poll factor of 2 to 1, meaning that the city has nearly 5000 jobs, while only having 2500 residents. Many of the small neighboring cities are bedroom communities for the many people who commute to work in Sabetha.

Education
The community is served by Prairie Hills USD 113 public school district, a public school district formed in 2010 by the merger of Sabetha USD 441 and Axtel USD 488.

Notable people
 Wilbur Bestwick (1911–1972), the first Sergeant Major of the United States Marine Corps
 Arthur Schabinger (1889–1972), basketball coach and administrator, member of the Basketball Hall of Fame
 Krishna Shenoy, neuroscientist and neuroengineer who was a professor at Stanford University

References

External links

 City of Sabetha
 Sabetha - Directory of Public Officials
 Sabetha city map, KDOT

1854 establishments in Kansas Territory
Cities in Brown County, Kansas
Cities in Kansas
Cities in Nemaha County, Kansas
Populated places established in 1854